Ngezi Platinum F.C. (also known as Ngezi Platinum Stars F.C.) is a Zimbabwean football club. They originated from Ngezi Mine & play at the newly refurbished Baobab Stadium in Ngezi.

Ngezi Platinum were promoted to the top flight for the first time in 2016 and proceeded to win the cup final that same season with a 3-1 victory over FC Platinum in the final. Coach Tonderai Ndiraya led Ngezi to a seventh-placed finish in their first season in the Premier Soccer League, but left by mutual consent with five games left in the 2018 season in which Ngezi Platinum ended up runners-up.

Brief History 
Ngezi Platinum Stars (NPS) FC formerly known as Ngezi Sporto FC started playing social soccer in 2001 and was at that time sponsored by MCC (Open Cast Contractor). However, in 2004 the club started playing competitive soccer and qualified to join the ZIFA Mashonaland West Division 2B. They played in the ZIFA Northern Region Division 1 in 2015 and won the championship to gain promotion into the Zimbabwe Premier Soccer League under the guidance of Clifton Kadurira.

TEAM / PLAYERS 
MCDONALD MAKUWE - STRIKER

WELLINGTON TADERERA - MIDFIELDER

QUADIR AMINI - DEFENDER

NELSON CHADJA - GOALKEEPER

MARLON MUSHONGA - MIDFIELDER

FRANK MAKARATI - DEFENDER

DEVON CHAFA - MIDFIELDER

MARLON CHANG - GOALKEEPER

BRUNO MTIGO - MIDFIELDER

ANELKA CHIVANDIRE - STRIKER

WAYNE MAKUVA - DEFENDER

TICHAONA MABVURA - MIDFIELDER

TENDAI MATINDIFE - STRIKER

POLITE MOYO - CENTER BACK

NIGEL MAKUMBE - MIDFIELDER

MUNASHE KATONDO - DEFENDER

MICHAEL CHARAMBA - MIDFIELDER

MANDLA MLILO - STRIKER

MALVIN KWINJO - MIDFIELDER

KUDZAI CHIGWIDA - CENTER BACK

KELVIN BULAJI - RIGHT BACK

KEITH MUERA - DEFENDER

JUNIOR ZINDOGA - STRIKER

JAMES NGULUVE - STRIKER

ISSAH ALI - GOALKEEPER

GERALD TAKWARA - CENTRAL MIDFIELDER

ARIEL MAKOPA - DEFENDER

Honours
Zimbabwe Premier Soccer League: 1Cup of Zimbabwe: 1 
 Northern Region Championship 2015
 Promotion To Division One Zimbabwe PSL In 2016
 Yadah Cup
 Chibuku Super Cup winners in 2016
 Chibuku Super Cup Losing Finalists (2019)

Performance in CAF competitionsCAF Champions League: 0 appearanceCAF Confederation Cup: 1 appearance'''
2017 – First round (round of 32)

References

Ngezi Platinum